The Love Album may refer to:

The Love Album (John Hartford album), 1968
The Love Album (Bobby Vinton album), 1971 compilation album
The Love Album (Shirley Bassey album), 1990 compilation album
The Love Album (Doris Day album), 1994
The Love Album (Westlife album), 2006

See also
Love... The Album, a 2007 album by Cliff Richard
Albums listed at Love (disambiguation)